Sunshine Cowboys Rugby League Club is an Australian rugby league football club based in Ardeer, Victoria. They conduct teams for both junior, senior and women tag teams.

Notable  Juniors

See also

Rugby league in Victoria

References

External links
Sunshine Cowboys Fox Sports pulse

Rugby league clubs in Melbourne
Rugby league teams in Victoria (Australia)
Rugby clubs established in 2016
2016 establishments in Australia
Sunshine, Victoria
Sport in the City of Brimbank